Berzhahn is an Ortsgemeinde – a community belonging to a Verbandsgemeinde – in the Westerwaldkreis in Rhineland-Palatinate, Germany.

Geography

Berzhahn lies on the north slope of the broad woodland 4 km southeast of Westerburg. Since 1972 it has belonged to what was then the newly founded Verbandsgemeinde of Westerburg, a kind of collective municipality.

History
In 1338, Berzhahn had its first documentary mention.

Politics

The municipal council is made up of 13 council members, including the extraofficial mayor (Bürgermeister), who were elected in a majority vote in a municipal election on 7 June 2009.

Economy and infrastructure

Southeast of the community runs Bundesstraße 255, which leads from Montabaur to Rennerod. The nearest Autobahn interchanges are Montabaur and Limburg an der Lahn on the A 3 (Cologne–Frankfurt am Main). Berzhahn lies on the Oberwesterwaldbahn (railway) to Limburg and Au (Sieg). From there, the cities of Cologne, Koblenz, Frankfurt am Main and Wiesbaden may be reached directly. The nearest InterCityExpress stops are the railway stations at Montabaur and Limburg Süd on the Cologne-Frankfurt high-speed rail line.

References

External links
 Berzhahn’s Internet presence
 Berzhahn in the collective municipality’s Web pages 

Municipalities in Rhineland-Palatinate
Westerwaldkreis